The 1953 American All Stars rugby league tour of Australia and New Zealand was a tour by a group of twenty men who had not previously played the sport of Rugby League. Most of the team were current or former College Gridiron footballers with Stanford University, the University of California, Los Angeles, or the University of Southern California. Some of the party had played rugby union at their colleges, during gridiron off-seasons.

Summary
The tour was instigated by player-manager Mike Dimitro, who claimed to have witnessed a game of rugby league in Sydney whilst serving in the Pacific during World War II. Dimitro had played for UCLA and was a high school teacher in Los Angeles in the lead up to the tour. Dimitro wrote to the Australian Rugby League Board of Control in February 1952. Several of the League's administrators were fervent promoters of their sport, and some were keen to take the game to the United States, so Dimitro's suggestion was favourably received. Another factor was the success of France's inaugural tour in 1951. Harold Matthews responded on behalf of the board in April 1952.

Apprised of the proposed tour, the New Zealand Rugby League were also interested, and their Secretary, J.E. Knowling, was able to meet with Mike Dimitro in Los Angeles.

Although arrangements in California did not run smoothly, with reassurances sought by the host nation boards, eighteen players arrived in Sydney on May 18, 1953. A further two players arrived on June 1.

The appointed coach, Norm “Latchem” Robinson, had less than a fortnight to educate the players. A touch-football game against South Sydney and a tackle match against a team of Army Engineers were used in preparations.

Remarkably, the American All Stars won their first match on the scheduled tour, beating a combined Monaro and Southern Districts side. 
The next two scheduled fixtures were against Sydney and New South Wales, and the Americans were understandably outclassed. The wisdom of setting novices against experienced semi-professionals so early in the tour was questioned at the time. The matches did, however, attract large crowds 65,453 on a Saturday against Sydney, and 32,554 on a Tuesday against New South Wales. There was consensus in the press that the host teams did take it easy on the visitors.

The tour progressed with matches in regional and country New South Wales, and then into Queensland. The Australian board had recommended that 28 players would be necessary given the two matches per week schedule, and injuries had an impact on the twenty-man squad. This led to the informal use of “ring-ins” in matches at Ipswich and Wagga, and formally in a return match against New South Wales on July 25, and throughout the New Zealand leg.

Through the tour the American players were commended for their excellent ball handling and robust tackling. The running ability of many, particularly the backs was praised. Referees showed leniency to a lack of understanding of offside rules in early matches. A slowness in comprehending and implementing cover defence was a common concern in reports on later matches.

A curiosity to local spectators and the press at the time was the All Stars' practice of warming up on the field with calisthenics, or “physical jerks”. Although this innovation did not immediately catch on, National Rugby League teams have utilised on field warm-ups since the 1990s.

A highlight for spectators was the American's use of the pitch-pass, with exhibitions given prior to most matches. In play, league rules against forward passing meant the pitch was restricted to lateral or backwards movement. Although a few pitch passes did lead to an All Stars try, usually the arc allowed defenders time to immediately tackle the receiver, or intercept.

A sad development of the tour was that Jack Bonetti contracted Polio. This was diagnosed after he entered hospital in Townsville, having exhibited pain after the match in Cairns.

Touring Squad 

Note: The tally of games in Australia, tries and goals collated from newspaper articles, as referenced below. In a few instances newspaper accounts differ. Some match reports do not mention all participants. A concession was made to allow the Americans to use substitutes in the event of first half injuries. This was unusual for the time. Normally no replacements were permitted.

Four Queenslanders  Harold Crocker, Brian Davies, Alan Hornery and Ken McCaffery  played for the American All Stars in the July 25 match against New South Wales.

Five of the tourists returned to the United States at the conclusion of the Australian leg. By arrangement with the New Zealand Rugby League, they were replaced by four, later five, New Zealanders: Travers Hardwick and Frank Mulcare who took on coaching duties, and also Des Barchard, Roy Moore and Roy Roff.

Australian Leg

New Zealand leg

Sources

References 

Rugby league in the United States
American All Stars tour of Australia and New Zealand
American All Stars tour of Australia and New Zealand